Arnold Mario Portocarrero (July 5, 1931 – June 21, 1986) was an American professional baseball player and right-handed pitcher who appeared in 166 games pitched in the major leagues over all or parts of seven seasons for the Philadelphia / Kansas City Athletics and Baltimore Orioles.

Signed by the Athletics after he graduated from New York's George Washington High School, Portocarrero broke in with Philadelphia in  after only two years of minor league experience and two years in the United States Army during the Korean War. In his first year in the majors, he was a franchise hope for the Athletics, who were in desperate shape both on the field and financially. It was hoped that the team might be good enough to improve attendance at Philadelphia's Connie Mack Stadium. The year before, some A's games had fewer than 2,000 people in the stands.

But the 1954 Athletics lost 103 games and finished last. Portocarrero posted a 9–18 record with a 4.06 earned run average; he finished second in the American League in games lost to Don Larsen of the Orioles and he led the league in wild pitches.  The Athletics' gate receipts did not improve, either. The team was sold to Arnold Johnson, a Chicago investor, and moved from Philadelphia to Kansas City. But Portocarrero struggled with arm miseries during , the A's first season in Kansas City, and spent part of  back in the minors.  He returned to the Athletics in  but failed to regain a regular spot in the Kansas City starting rotation. He worked in 33 games, with 17 starts, and went 4–9 (3.92).

On the eve of the  campaign, Portocarrero was traded to Baltimore for left-handed pitcher Bud Daley. He responded with a career-best season, winning 15 games, fifth-most in the American League, losing 11, and finishing tenth in the league in earned run average (3.25). He threw a career-best three shutouts (including back-to-back whitewashings May 30 against Boston and June 3 against Detroit), and from June 29 through July 20 he hurled five consecutive complete game victories. It would be his only winning campaign in the major leagues.

By that time, he was still winless in five decisions. He would win only two games all season, losing seven. Then, in —his last year in the major leagues—Portocarrero split the year between Triple-A and the Orioles. In his final appearance in the big leagues June 15, 1960, he allowed five runs in relief to the Cleveland Indians, although only two of them were earned. He retired after the 1961 season.

As a major leaguer, Portocarrero won 38 and lost 57, with an earned run average of 4.32. In 817 innings pitched, he allowed 778 hits and 320 bases on balls. He struck out 338, compiled 33 career complete games, five shutouts and two saves.

References

External links

1931 births
1986 deaths
American sportspeople of Puerto Rican descent
Baltimore Orioles players
Birmingham Barons players
Fayetteville A's players
George Washington Educational Campus alumni
Kansas City Athletics players
Kansas City Roos baseball players
Lincoln A's players
Major League Baseball pitchers
Miami Marlins (IL) players
Philadelphia Athletics players
Rochester Red Wings players
Baseball players from New York City
West Palm Beach Indians players